San Carlo Gruppo Alimentare S.p.A. is an Italian manufacturer of snack foods, including crisps and crackers. International brands include the Spanish brand Crecs, French brands Flodor and Gardeil, and Highlander crisps in the United Kingdom.

History
Originally a rotisserie house, the  'Rosticceria San Carlo'  was established in 1936 by Francesco Vitaloni in Milan and named in honour of a nearby church.

Initially, his production of potato products were as accompaniments to meats and fish dishes, however, the demand for them was very high, and he began exclusive production of 'Patatine croccanti' (crispy potatoes), and began distributing them to the local bakeries and bars.

Products
Current products include potato crisps, rippled crisps, hard pretzels and pretzel sticks, dried breads and crackers and cake products, including croissants.

External links
 sancarlo.it Official website

Brand name snack foods
Food and drink companies of Italy